The Diocese of Bukoba may refer to two stages of a Latin Catholic Diocese with successive sees in northwestern Tanzania :

 The former Roman Catholic Diocese of Bukoba, until June 21, 1960; established on 1929.04.08 as Apostolic Vicariate of Bubuka, promoted bishopric on 1953.03.25
 (informally) The Roman Catholic Diocese of Rulenge, its successor see, itself renamed Roman Catholic Diocese of Rulenge–Ngara on 2008.08.14
 The Lutheran Diocese of Bukoba